Eikonrød Station is a former railway station on the Vestfold Line, located at Eikonrød in Skien, Norway.

References

Railway stations in Vestfold og Telemark
Railway stations on the Bratsberg Line
Railway stations on the Vestfold Line
Disused railway stations in Norway
Railway stations opened in 1916
1916 establishments in Norway
1973 disestablishments in Norway
Buildings and structures in Skien